Old Muscat is the original historic city of Muscat, the capital of Oman, on the coast in the Gulf of Oman.

Overview
The old city of Muscat is separated from the rest of modern Muscat by coastal mountains. It is located along the Muttrah Corniche coastal road (entering via the Muscat Gate Museum) between Port Sultan Qaboos and Al Bustan Beach. The city is protected by a wall with round towers, built in 1625, on the western and southern sides. The Gulf of Oman and the surrounding mountains form a natural boundary to the east and north. Until the mid-20th century, the gates were closed three hours after dusk. Anyone on the streets after this time had to carry a lantern with them. In addition, smoking was banned on the main streets and the public playing of music was also banned.

Tourism
Tourist attractions in Old Muscat include:

 Al Alam Palace
 Al Saidiya Street
 Bait Al Zubair
 Fort Al Jalali
 Fort Al-Mirani
 Muscat Gate Museum
 The National Museum
 Omani French Museum

See also

 Capture of Muscat (1552)
 Muttrah, including the Muttrah Souq
 Port Sultan Qaboos
 Timeline of Muscat, Oman

References

External links
 

 
Geography of Muscat, Oman
Tourist attractions in Muscat, Oman
Gulf of Oman